Palasport Olimpico, officially operating with the sponsored name Pala Alpitour except during events prohibiting sponsorship names when it is usually known as simply PalaOlimpico, or occasionally PalaIsozaki after its architect, is a multi-purpose indoor arena located within Torino Olympic Park in the Santa Rita district of Turin, Italy. Opened in December 2005, the arena has a seating capacity of 12,350 when it is configured for ice hockey, and it is the largest indoor sporting arena in Italy.

The arena was originally built at a cost of €87 million, for the 2006 Winter Olympics, and along with the Torino Esposizioni, it hosted the ice hockey events. It is a few metres east of the Olympic Stadium. On 8 August 2014, the arena was renamed to Pala Alpitour following a sponsorship deal with Italian travel company  and in November 2020 became the fifth arena, the first in Italy, to be admitted as a member to the International Venue Alliance circuit.

Construction

The design of the building was the subject of an international competition, which was won in June 2002. The winning bid consisted of a team composed of Arata Isozaki and Andrea Maffei Associates, who directed the design, with ArchA SpA of Turin, Arup Italia ​​of Milan and Favero & Milan Ingegneria, engineer Giuseppe Amaro and the architect Marco Brizio.

Architecture and design
The futuristic building's exterior has a strict rectangular Cartesian coated stainless steel and glass structure, with a base of 183 by 100 metres. It is spread over four levels, of which two are underground (up to 7.5 metres below ground) and two outdoors (up to 12 metres high). The overall length of the structure is about 200 metres. The structure, designed to be a veritable factory of events, using the words of its architect. The arena is completely flexible and adaptable in its internal structure, and with the arrangement of the stands. Due to a modern system of movable and retractable bleachers, and also the option of a temporary movable deck. The structure's acoustics are also adaptable.

Events

The arena is a kind of "magic box", and was designed to host many different types of events beyond the Olympics. It serves as a venue for events including concerts, exhibitions, trade fairs, conferences, and various sports, such as basketball, ice hockey, curling and volleyball. Since its opening, the Pala Alpitour has become one of Italy's most booked venues for large-scale concerts. It is also the largest capacity venue in Italy for these type of events, with the allowed maximum capacities set at 15,657 for general admission center-stage concerts, and 13,347 maximum capacity for general admission end-stage concerts.

In addition to concerts, the arena has also been able to host successful touring shows and musicals over the years such as Notre Dame de Paris, Romeo and Juliet, Cirque du Soleil, and occasionally sporting events including WWE professional wrestling in 2007, 2011, in 2014 and 2018, and the car shows Top Gear Live in July 2014 and Fast & Furious Live in September 2018.

Sports

It was inaugurated on 13 December 2005, with the name PalaOlimpico, during a friendly match in ice hockey between the men's national teams of Italy and Canada. Between 10 and 26 February 2006, it was the main venue for the ice hockey events of the 2006 Winter Olympics, hosting the main matches of the first group stage and then all those of the final stages of the men's and women's tournaments.

In January 2007, the venue hosted the opening and closing ceremonies and selected ice hockey matches of the XXIII Winter Universiade.

In basketball, the Pala Alpitour hosted the 2008–09 EuroCup Basketball final stage, and the 2016 FIBA World Olympic Qualifying Tournament. The Palasport was due to host the 2010–11 season's Final Four of the EuroLeague, as announced on February 16, 2010, but the event was later moved to the Palau Sant Jordi, in Barcelona. It was one of the three main venues of the 2016 FIBA World Olympic Qualifying Tournaments for Men, which was held in Italy, the Philippines, and Serbia on July 4–10, 2016.

The mixed martial arts events Bellator 152 and Bellator 176 were held at Pala Alpitour on 16 April 2016 and 8 April 2017 respectively. The third and final round of the 2018 FIVB Volleyball Men's World Championship were also held at the venue.

From 2021 to 2025, the Pala Alpitour will host the tennis ATP Finals, marking the first time in history in which Italy will host the tournament.

Music

Pala Alpitour has become one of the main venues for music events in Italy. Artists such as Bob Dylan, Madonna, Rihanna, U2, Florence and the Machine, 5 Seconds of Summer, Lana Del Rey, Ariana Grande, Shakira, Renato Zero, Tiziano Ferro, Il Volo, Elisa and Marco Mengoni have performed in the arena.

On 8 October 2021, the European Broadcasting Union (EBU) and the Italian broadcaster RAI announced that the venue would host the Eurovision Song Contest 2022, following Italy's victory at the  contest in Rotterdam, Netherlands with the song "Zitti e buoni", performed by Måneskin. The semi-finals of the contest took place on 10 and 12 May, and the grand final on 14 May.

See also
List of indoor arenas in Italy
List of European ice hockey arenas
List of tennis stadiums by capacity

References

External links

 
Torino Olympic Park site 

2005 establishments in Italy
Venues of the 2006 Winter Olympics
Arata Isozaki buildings
Indoor arenas in Italy
Basketball venues in Italy
Tennis venues in Italy
Volleyball venues in Italy
Indoor ice hockey venues in Italy
Modernist architecture in Italy
Olympic ice hockey venues
Buildings and structures in Turin
Sports venues in Turin
Sports venues completed in 2005
Music venues completed in 2005